229th may refer to:

1st Battalion, 229th Aviation Regiment, an Attack Helicopter Battalion operating AH-64 Apaches attack and OH-58 Kiowa scout helicopters
229th (South Saskatchewan) Battalion, CEF, a unit in the Canadian Expeditionary Force during the First World War
2nd Battalion, 229th Aviation Regiment, the only United States Army Attack Helicopter unit in history to have captured enemy troops

See also
229 (number)
229, the year 229 (CCXXIX) of the Julian calendar
229 BC